Nikita Poudel is a Nepalese film producer and former chairperson of Nepal Film Development Board.

Career 

Poudel has produced many Nepalese film including Kusume Rumal 2, Sundar Mero Naam, and Preeti Ko Phool. She became the first female to be chairperson of Nepal Film Development Board on 15 December 2017. She resigned from February 2019 for violating rules of the board.

Personal life 
Poudel is married to Rabi Lamichhane since 2019.

References

External links 
 

1982 births
Living people
Nepalese film producers
People from Kathmandu
Nepalese women film producers